Joseph Russell McGrae (24 October 1903 – 19 November 1975) was a professional footballer.

McGrae, a defender, began his career with Everton before playing for Tranmere Rovers, Norwich City, Bradford City, Clapton Orient, and Halifax Town.

While with Norwich, McGrae made 124 appearances and scored three goals.

References

1903 births
1975 deaths
Everton F.C. players
Tranmere Rovers F.C. players
Norwich City F.C. players
Bradford City A.F.C. players
Leyton Orient F.C. players
Halifax Town A.F.C. players
English footballers
Footballers from Liverpool
Association football defenders